Louis Folwell Hart (4 January 18624 December 1929) was an American politician who served as the seventh Lieutenant Governor of Washington from 1913 to 1919 and as the ninth governor of Washington from 1919 to 1925. He was a Republican. He reorganized the state's administrative structure by reducing the number of agencies and the consequent financial economies.

Biography
Hart was born in High Point, Missouri and studied law in Missouri. He married Ella James on 9 February 1881 in Missouri and over the course of years they had five children, three sons and two daughters,

Career
Lured by the frontier, Hart and his wife moved to Snohomish, Washington in the late1880s, where he practiced law. In 1899 they moved to Tacoma where he continued to practice law and was an insurance agent.

Winning the Republican nomination in 1912, Hart was elected as Washington's seventh Lieutenant Governor and he was reelected in 1916.

During World War I Hart served chairman of the Selective Service Appeals Board for Southwest Washington. Hart became governor when the then -governor Ernest Lister retired in 1919 due to failing health.

Hart was elected governor in his own right in 1920. Hart was instrumental in getting new road projects through the state legislature and strongly supported the creation of a state highway patrol.  He oversaw the construction of a new State Capitol complex. Perhaps his greatest accomplishment was reorganizing the state's administrative structure, reducing the number of administrative agencies from 75 to 10.

He did not have a Lieutenant Governor from his election as governor until William J. Coyle was appointed to the office in 1921. He is the last governor of the state, to date, that did not have a Lieutenant Governor at any time during his governorship.

Hart did not run for reelection in 1924, but instead retired to Tacoma where he practiced law, and served as the president of the State Good Roads Association.

Death
Hart died on 4 December 1929, in Tacoma, Washington. He is interred at Masonic Memorial Park, Tumwater, Washington.

References

Further reading
Sobel, Robert, and Raimo, John (eds.) (1978) Biographical Directory of the Governors of the United States, 1789-1978 Vol. 4. Meckler Books, Westport, CT, 
White, J.T. (ed.) (1933) The National Cyclopaedia of American Biography, being the history of the United States  Vol. 23. James T. White & Company, New York, OCLC 64067983

External links
National Governors Association
Washington Secretary of State

1862 births
1929 deaths
Republican Party governors of Washington (state)
Lieutenant Governors of Washington (state)
Methodists from Washington (state)
20th-century American politicians
People from Moniteau County, Missouri
Methodists from Missouri
Politicians from Tacoma, Washington
19th-century American lawyers
20th-century American lawyers
Washington (state) lawyers